Stryhaniéc ( Strykhanets) is a village in the Belarusian Zhabinka raion, in Brest voblast. Stryhaniéc is administered by the Rakitnisky village council.

References

Populated places in Brest Region